is a railway station in Kyōwa, Hokkaidō, Japan. It is operated by JR Hokkaido and has the station number "S22".

Lines

Station layout
Kozawa Station consists of an island platform connected to the station building by a footbridge.

Platforms

History
After the Hokkaido Railway was nationalized on 1 July 1907, Japanese Government Railways (JGR) took over control of the station. On 12 October 1909, the station became part of the Hakodate Main Line. On 1 April 1987, with the privatization of Japanese National Railways (JNR), the successor of JGR, the station came under the control of JR Hokkaido. From 1 October 2007, station numbering was introduced on JR Hokkaido lines, with Kozawa Station becoming "S22".

References

Railway stations in Hokkaido Prefecture
Railway stations in Japan opened in 1904